An Jong-goan (born 30 August 1966) is a South Korean football manager.

Career
An was the head coach of the South Korea women's national team at the 2003 FIFA Women's World Cup.

References

External links
 
 
 An Jong-goan at Soccerdonna.de 

1966 births
Living people
South Korean football managers
Women's association football managers
South Korea women's national football team managers
2003 FIFA Women's World Cup managers